Mustafa Azadzoy (Pashto: مصطفي ازادزوي; born 24 July 1992) is an Afghan professional footballer who plays as a midfielder for Atlas Delmenhorst and the Afghanistan national team.

Early life
Azadzoy was born in Afghanistan to a Pashtun family, and has five older brothers and sisters. When he was just six months old his family moved to Germany, although his uncle and aunt remain in Afghanistan. Soon clubs started noticing his talent, after spending time with Delmenhorster BV he was recruited by VfB Oldenburg who put Azadoy in their youth system.

Club career
After spending his youth career in VfB Oldenburg he signed for TB Uphusen in 2013.

International career
In 2011, Azadzoy made his debut for Afghanistan national team in the 2011 SAFF Championship. In February 2013 Azadzoy was called up by Afghan coach Mohammad Yousef Kargar to play for Afghanistan against Sri Lanka encouraged by fellow Afghan-German footballer Mansur Faqiryar.

Azadzoy was part of Afghanistan's squad at the 2013 SAFF Championship, in which he scored his first ever goal against Bhutan in a 3–0 win in the group stages. He also scored the first goal in the Final against India, helping Afghanistan to a 2–0 win and handing them their first ever SAFF Championship.

Azadoy had the honor of being included in Afghanistan's squad for the 2014 AFC Challenge Cup in the Maldives. In the group stages of the tournament Afghanistan claimed their first ever win at the AFC Challenge Cup with a 3–1 victory over Turkmenistan. Unfortunately after Afghanistan's 0–0 draw with Laos that confirmed their progression out of the group stage, an accident occurred while the Afghan players were being driven back to their hotel. Azadoy had to spend time in hospital over night and is set to miss three weeks, while his teammates Zohib Islam Amiri, Faisal Sakhizada, Ahmad Hatifi and Balal Arezou all suffered minor injuries. All five players are set to miss the semi finals against Palestine. Former coach Mohammad Yousef Kargar and current coach Erich Rutemöller also suffered minor injuries.

Career statistics 
Scores and results list Afghanistan's goal tally first, score column indicates score after each Azadzoy goal.

Honours

Afghanistan
SAFF Championship: 2013

References

External links

Goal.com Profile

football.com profile

1992 births
Living people
Footballers from Kabul
Afghan men's footballers
Afghan emigrants to Germany
Afghanistan international footballers
Association football midfielders
Asian Games competitors for Afghanistan
Footballers at the 2014 Asian Games
Mustafa Azadzoy
Mustafa Azadzoy
Mustafa Azadzoy
Mustafa Azadzoy
Mustafa Azadzoy
Mustafa Azadzoy
Afghan expatriate footballers
Afghan expatriate sportspeople in Thailand
Expatriate footballers in Thailand